Nienburg (official name: Nienburg/Weser) (Low German: Nienborg, Neenborg or Negenborg) is a town and capital of the district Nienburg, in Lower Saxony, Germany.

Geography
Nienburg is the largest town in the Middle Weser Region.

Demography

(as of Dec. 31st)

Structure
Nienburg, including quarters
 Erichshagen
 Holtorf
 Langendamm
 Schäferhof/Kattriede
 Nordertor
 Leintor
 Lehmwandlung
 Alpheide

History
The major reason for the emergence and development of Nienburg into the largest city in the Middle Weser region was its location at a convenient ford in the Weser River, leading to multiple trade routes radiating from the location. As early as 1025 the location was referred to as Negenborg, i.e. New Castle. In 1215 it began to be referred to as a city, a civitas, when Count Henry I of Hoya began the residence of his ruling line. From 1582 until 1866 the Guelph (Welf) Dukes of Brunswick-Lüneburg controlled the county, except for Napoleonic French rule from 1803 to 1813. In 1871, it became part of the German Empire.

During World War II, it was the location of German prisoner-of-war camps Oflag X-B and Stalag X-C, in which French, Polish, Belgian, Romanian, Serbian, Italian and Soviet POWs were held.

The former County of Wölpe was the seat of the Grafen (counts) von Wölpe with its associated castle. The castle (Burg Wölpe) was destroyed in the Hildesheim Diocesan Feud in 1522.

Politics

Mayor
Since the 2021 elections, the mayor is Jan Wendorf (independent). The previous mayor was Henning Onkes (independent). He was reelected in 2014 against three competitors.

Local council (Stadtrat)
The 38 members of the "Stadtrat" are divided among:
 CDU:  13, among them the second deputy mayor Wilhelm Schlemermeyer
 SPD:14, among them the first deputy mayor Rolf Warnecke
 Alliance 90/The Greens: 6, among them the third deputy mayor Hedda Freese
 FDP: 1
 Wählergemeinschaft - Independent Union of Citizens WG 3
 The Left (Germany): 1
 One additional vote by the elected mayor of Nienburg, Mr. Henning Onkes, who doesn't belong to any political party

The elections in September 2016 showed the following results:
 CDU: 13 seats
 SPD: 12 seats
 Alliance 90/The Greens: 5 seats
 Wählergruppe Nienburg: 3seats
 FDP: 2 seats
 THE LEFT: 2 seats
 ULN: 1 seat

Twin towns – sister cities

Nienburg is twinned with:
 Bartoszyce, Poland
 Las Cruces, New Mexico, United States
 Nienburg, Saxony-Anhalt, Germany
 Vitebsk, Belarus

Notable people
Heinrich Lübbe (1884–1940), engineer
Oskar Gröning (1921–2018), SS Unterscharführer at the Auschwitz concentration camp
Lutz Meyer-Gossner (born 1936), judge at the Federal Court from 1983 to 2001
Volker Finke (born 1948), football coach
Susanne Schröter (born 1957), professor of ethnology
Carsten Sieling (born 1959), politician, mayor and president of the senate of the Free Hanseatic City of Bremen (SPD)
Maja Maranow (1961–2016), actress
Levent Ayçiçek (born 1994), footballer

See also
Metropolitan region Hannover-Braunschweig-Göttingen-Wolfsburg

References

External links
 

Towns in Lower Saxony
Nienburg (district)